Methylobacillus glycogenes is a Gram-negative methylotrophic bacteria that can only grow on methanol or methylamine, but under nitrogen-limiting conditions synthesizes glycogen as an internal reserve material.

External links
Type strain of Methylobacillus glycogenes at BacDive -  the Bacterial Diversity Metadatabase

Methylophilaceae
Bacteria described in 1977